PGO Scooters is a brand of motor scooter manufactured by Motive Power Industry, a scooter manufacturer founded in Taiwan in 1964.

PGO entered into a technical collaboration with Italy's Piaggio (the manufacturer of the Vespa) that lasted from 1972 to 1982; it is also from there that the company gets its name (P iag G i O).

PGO Scooters, in the United States, are imported and distributed by Genuine Scooters and its models are known there as the Hooligan, Blur, Buddy, and Roughhouse. In Canada, PGO scooters are sold under the PGO brand.

For a time, PGO Scooters also imported and distributed its scooters with its own branding, namely the Bubu, G-Max, and PMX models.

PGO scooters were bought in large quantities by contract for the use of the national Danish mail company Post Danmark.

See also
 List of companies of Taiwan
 List of Taiwanese automakers
 Automotive industry in Taiwan

References

1964 establishments in Taiwan
Scooter manufacturers
Motor scooters
Vehicle manufacturing companies established in 1964
Taiwanese brands